White Stadium, formally the George R. White Memorial Stadium, is a 10,519 seat facility located in Franklin Park, Boston that was constructed between 1947 and 1949 for the use of Boston Public Schools athletics.

History
Financed by the George Robert White fund, the cost was originally estimated to be between $350,000 to $450,000, however the final amount ballooned to $1,000,000, a figure that city clerk and former acting mayor John Hynes blamed on Mayor James Michael Curley.

Twice postponed due to weather, the opening football games on October 1, 1949 were:
 Boston Technical High School besting Boston College High School 12-6
 Dorchester High defeating Boston Trade 18-0
 Boston English defeating Roxbury Memorial High School 12-6
 Boston Latin School beating Boston Commerce 33-6

In 1970, a proposal was made to enlarge the stadium to 50,000 seats for a potential home for the New England Patriots.

A $45 million renovation and expansion was planned, starting in 2013. The project was shelved by Mayor Marty Walsh, citing budget concerns.

Other events
A rally by the Black Panther Party was held in the park in 1969.

Uptown in the Park, a three part series of funk/soul and jazz concerts to benefit Elma Lewis School of Fine Arts, was held in the park in 1974.  On July 7 Sly and the Family Stone along with Tower of Power, Hues Corporation, Donald Byrd and the Blackbyrds and Richard Pryor performed. Funkadelic performed on August 25 along with The Voices of East Harlem, the Isley Brothers, Gil Scott-Heron, Mandrill and Bar-Kays. September 2's concert included performances by the Ohio Players, Staple Singers, Bobbi Humphrey and Bobby Womack.

References

Sports venues completed in 1949
Sports venues in Boston